Kisi Ka Bhai Kisi Ki Jaan is an upcoming Indian Hindi-language action film directed by Farhad Samji and produced by Salman Khan Films. The film stars Salman Khan, Venkatesh, Pooja Hegde and Jagapathi Babu, Aasif Sheikh with an ensemble supporting cast. 

Principal photography began in May 2022 and ended in February 2023 with filming taking place in Mumbai, Hyderabad and Ladakh. It is scheduled for release on 21 April 2023, coinciding with Eid festival.

Premise 
Bhaijaan is an honest man, who lives happily with his brothers and uses violence to settle disputes with anyone, but decides to mend his ways for his girlfriend. However, Bhaijaan learns that his girlfriend's family are in trouble due to their past rival and sets out to protect them without anyone's knowledge.

Cast 
 Salman Khan as Bhaijaan   
 Venkatesh
 Pooja Hegde
 Jagapathi Babu
 Aasif Sheikh
 Jassie Gill
 Raghav Juyal
 Siddharth Nigam
 Bhumika Chawla
 Bhagyashree
 Shehnaaz Gill
 Abhimanyu Singh
 Vijender Singh
 Abdu Rozik
 Malvika Sharma
 Palak Tiwari
 Amrita Puri
 Ram Charan in a cameo appearance in a song 
 Yo Yo Honey Singh in a cameo appearance in a song

Production

Development 
Director Farhad Samji initially sought to remake the 2014 Tamil film Veeram as Bachchhan Paandey (previously titled Land of Lungi) with Akshay Kumar. However later, he changed the script of Bachchhan Paandey to be the remake of another Tamil film Jigarthanda instead. As Nadiadwala Grandson Entertainment held the remake rights of both the films, Samji tweaked Veeram's story and pitched to Salman Khan who accepted the film. Later, Nadiadwala walked out of the project and gave the rights to Khan, who then decided to make the film under his banner Salman Khan Films. 

The film was announced on 10 January 2020 with the title Kabhi Eid Kabhi Diwali. However, it was later postponed for a longtime and suffered numerous pre-production delays due to the COVID-19 pandemic, and later it was revived with the reported title Bhaijaan. However, in August 2022, the film's official title was announced as Kisi Ka Bhai Kisi Ki Jaan. After all this drama the film is finally going to release on eid 2023.

Casting 
In February 2020, Pooja Hegde was signed as the female lead. In December 2021, Venkatesh joined the cast, marking his comeback to Hindi cinema after Taqdeerwala (1995). Jassie Gill, Siddharth Nigam and Raghav Juyal were roped in to play Khan's brothers in the film.

Punjabi cinema actress Shehnaaz Gill, South Indian cinema actress Malvika Sharma, newbie Palak Tiwari and boxer-politician Vijender Singh were signed, marking their Hindi film debut with the film. Jagapathi Babu was signed in to play a pivotal role, making it his second Hindi film after Radhe Shyam (2022) which also starred Hegde. Aasif Sheikh was signed in to play pivotal role, Ram Charan was cast for a special appearance.

Filming 
Principal photography began on 12 May 2022 in Mumbai. Later in June, the production moved to Hyderabad. In August 2022, a song was filmed along with some portions in Ladakh. The shooting of the film was wrapped up in February 2023.

Music 

In June 2022, Bollywood Hungama reported that Ravi Basrur was approached to compose the background score and one song. The source also claimed that Devi Sri Prasad, who was earlier signed for the film, opted out of the project. Prasad, however, denied the rumors, saying that he had already composed a dance number for the film. Himesh Reshammiya, Sajid Khan, Sukhbir, Payal Dev, Devi Sri Prasad, Ravi Basrur & Amaal Mallik have been signed to compose songs as well. The teaser of the song "Naiyo Lagda" was showcased during the grand finale of Bigg Boss 16 and a day later, on 12 February 2023, the song was released on YouTube and music platforms. The second single titled "Billi Billi" was released on 2 March 2023. The third single titled "Jee Rahe The Hum (Falling in Love)" is scheduled to release on 21 March 2023.

Release 
The film is scheduled for theatrical release on 21 April 2023, coinciding with Eid. Film will be released by Salman Khan Films, Panorama Studios, Pen India Limited (India). Zee Studios, Phars Film (International).

See also 
 Salim–Javed
 Khans of Bollywood

References

External links 
 

Hindi remakes of Tamil films
Indian action comedy films
Films scored by Devi Sri Prasad
Films scored by Himesh Reshammiya
Films scored by Sajid–Wajid
Films scored by Amaal Mallik